Stefan Gabriel Della Rovere (born February 25, 1990) is a Canadian professional ice hockey player currently playing under contract with Heilbronner Falken of the DEL2. Della Rovere was drafted in the seventh round, 204th overall, by the Washington Capitals in the 2008 NHL Entry Draft.

Internationally, Della Rovere represented Canada at the 2009 and 2010 World Junior Ice Hockey Championships, winning a gold and silver medal respectively.

Playing career
Della Rovere grew up in Maple, Ontario, a suburban community northwest of Toronto. He attended St. Joan of Arc Catholic High School in Maple. He played his minor hockey in the Greater Toronto Hockey League with the Vaughan Rangers, Toronto Marlboros and Toronto Jr. Canadiens.

After his 2005–06 minor midget year with the Jr. Canadiens, Della Rovere joined the Barrie Colts of the Ontario Hockey League (OHL) as their first round selection, 16th overall, in the 2006 OHL Priority Selection draft. He scored 7 goals in 48 games as a 17-year-old rookie, and won a gold medal with Team Ontario at the 2007 Canada Winter Games.

After improving to 13 goals and 32 points in 2007–08, Della Rovere was selected by the Washington Capitals in the seventh round of the 2008 NHL Entry Draft. He has become a valuable prospect in the eyes of the Capitals following a standout season with the Colts in 2008–09 that also saw him earn a spot on Canada's gold medal-winning team at the 2009 World Junior Ice Hockey Championships. He signed a contract with the Capitals late in the season and made his professional debut with Washington's ECHL affiliate, the South Carolina Stingrays, recording one assist in two games played.

Della Rovere returned to Barrie for the 2009–10 season, where he was named team captain. While praised by his coaches and teammates for his hard working attitude, Della Rovere has also been criticized for a lack of discipline on the ice, which he promised to change upon earning a spot on the Canadian roster for the 2010 World Junior tournament.

Following the 2010 season, Della Rovere's NHL rights were traded to the St. Louis Blues in exchange for D. J. King. Della Rovere was called up by the Blues on December 1, 2010, and made his NHL debut that evening against the team that drafted him, the Washington Capitals.

On September 28, 2014, the Toronto Marlies of the American Hockey League (AHL) announced it had signed Della Rovere to an AHL contract. After competing in the Marlies training camp, he was reassigned to ECHL affiliate, the Orlando Solar Bears, for the duration of the 2014–15 season. He was designated as team captain as he scored 26 points in 59 games.

On August 30, 2015, Della Rovere was revealed at a roster ceremony to have signed a one-year contract abroad with HC Valpellice of the Italian Serie A.

After a spell with HC Fassa of the Alps Hockey League, Della Rovere joined British Elite Ice Hockey League (EIHL) side Braehead Clan in February 2017. On 21 July 2017, Della Rovere departed signed for Kassel Huskies of the German DEL2. In July 2018, Della Rovere moved back to the UK to sign for Sheffield Steelers of the EIHL.

In the 2018–19 season, Della Rovere played in 36 games for 16 points with the Steelers, before leaving the club and making a familiar return to the DEL2 in joining Dresdner Eislöwen for the remainder of the season on January 18, 2019.

Career statistics

Regular season and playoffs

International

References

External links

1990 births
Living people
Canadian people of Italian descent
Barrie Colts players
Braehead Clan players
Canadian ice hockey left wingers
Dresdner Eislöwen players
Evansville IceMen players
Florida Everblades players
SHC Fassa players
Heilbronner Falken players
Hershey Bears players
Kassel Huskies players
Ice hockey people from Ontario
Orlando Solar Bears (ECHL) players
People from Vaughan
Peoria Rivermen (AHL) players
St. Louis Blues players
South Carolina Stingrays players
Sheffield Steelers players
Sportspeople from Richmond Hill, Ontario
HC Valpellice players
Washington Capitals draft picks
Naturalized citizens of Germany
Canadian expatriate ice hockey players in Scotland
Canadian expatriate ice hockey players in Italy
Canadian expatriate ice hockey players in Germany
Canadian expatriate ice hockey players in the United States
Canadian expatriate ice hockey players in England